Soltan Ahmadlu (also Romanized as Solţān Aḩmadlū; also known as Qeshlāq-e Aḩmadī) is a village in Rudshur Rural District, in the Central District of Zarandieh County, Markazi Province, Iran. At the 2006 census, its population was 173, in 48 families.

References 

Populated places in Zarandieh County